Jimmy Connors was the defending champion.

Connors successfully defended his title, defeating John McEnroe, 6–3, 2–6, 6–3, 3–6, 6–4 in the final.

Seeds

  Jimmy Connors (champion)
  John McEnroe (final)
  Vitas Gerulaitis (second round)
 N/A
  Harold Solomon (quarterfinals)
  José Higueras (third round)
  Gene Mayer (semifinals)
  Peter Fleming (second round)
  Wojtek Fibak (quarterfinals)
  José Luis Clerc (quarterfinals)
  Brian Gottfried (third round)
 N/A
  Stan Smith (third round)
  Victor Amaya (second round)
  Yannick Noah (first round)
  Tim Gullikson (third round)

Draw

Finals

Top half

Section 1

Section 2

Bottom half

Section 3

Section 4

References

 Main Draw

U.S. Pro Indoor
1980 Grand Prix (tennis)